The 1880 Barnstaple by-election occurred in Barnstaple, Devon 12 February 1880.

Results

References 

1880 elections in the United Kingdom
19th century in Devon
By-elections to the Parliament of the United Kingdom in Devon constituencies
February 1880 events